The Lusaka National Museum is a museum located in Lusaka, Zambia, covering the history and culture of the nation.

History
While construction began in the 1980s, the Lusaka National Museum officially opened to the public in October 1996.  While the museum was originally intended to focus on the history of Zambian independence, its focus changed to cultural history by the time it opened.

Galleries
The museum collection is preserved in storage rooms, while other heritage objects are displayed in two galleries on the ground and upper floors of the museum building.

The lower gallery is home to contemporary art, highlighting the way of life of the Zambian people through paintings, sculptures and models. The upper gallery tells a glowing story of Zambia's development, from ancient through historic past to contemporary way of life. The children's corner is yet another display attraction on the upper floor.

References

External links
 Museums in Zambia
 Lonely Planet

Museums in Zambia
Buildings and structures in Lusaka
Museums established in 1996
1996 establishments in Zambia
Tourist attractions in Lusaka Province
National museums